is a district of Setagaya, Tokyo, Japan.

Education
Setagaya Board of Education operates public elementary and junior high schools.

1 and 2-chome are zoned to Musashigaoka Elementary School (武蔵丘小学校). 3-4 and 6-chome and parts of 5-chome are zoned to Karasuyama Kita Elementary School (烏山北小学校). 7-9-chome and parts of 5-chome are zoned to Kyuden Elementary School (給田小学校). 1-8-chome are zoned to Karasuyama Junior High School (烏山中学校) while 9-chome is zoned to Kamisoshigaya Junior High School (上祖師谷中学校).

References

Districts of Setagaya